Jawaharlal Nehru Port Trust (JNPT) or JLN Port, also known as Nhava Sheva Port, is the second largest container port in India after Mundra Port. It is located on the Arabian Sea in Navi Mumbai's Raigad district, This port can be accessed via Thane Creek, a nodal city of Navi Mumbai. Its common name derives from the names of Nhava and Sheva villages that are situated here. This port is also the terminal of the Western Dedicated Freight Corridor.

As of January 2023, the port is undergoing upgrades with the help of a loan agreement signed between the Asian Development Bank (ADB) and Nhava Sheva Freeport Terminal Private Limited (NSFTPL). The loan of $131 million will be used to improve the terminal's infrastructure, increase its container handling capacity, upgrade existing berths and yards, and install energy-efficient equipment. The upgrades aim to attract vessels and make international trade more efficient, transparent and sustainable.

History 
The port was established on 26 May 1989.
 
JN Port is the second largest container handling port in India after Mundra Port, crossing 4 million TEUs (Twenty-foot equivalent units) in containers throughout consecutively between 2016 and 2021.
 
JNP consists of a full-fledged Customs House, 30 Container Freight Stations and connectivity to 52 Inland Container Depots across the country.  The hinterland connectivity both by rail and road is being further strengthened by ongoing projects like the Dedicated Freight Corridor (DFC), which will increase the existing train capacity from 27 to 100 trains per day; Multi-Modal Logistics Park (MMLP) and widening of the Port's road connectivity. It is in proximity to the Cities of Mumbai, Navi Mumbai and Pune; airports; hotels, exhibition centres, etc. gives the Port an extra edge to address the shippers’ needs, efficiently and promptly.

Facilities

The JNP Trust (JNPT) Container Terminal is operated by JNPT.

The Nhava Sheva International Container Terminal (NSICT) is leased to a consortium led by P & O, now a part of DP World. Commissioned in July 2000, it has a  quay length with two berths. It can handle up to 62.15 million tons of cargo. NSICT was India’s first privately managed container terminal. In the year 2006, GTI (Gateway Terminals India Pvt Ltd), a third container terminal operated by APM Terminals, with the capacity to handle 1.3 Million TEUs was commissioned. A new standalone container terminal by the name of NSIGT having a quay length of 330 m and a capacity of 12.5 Million Tonnes will be fully operational by July 2016. The fourth container terminal, Bharat Mumbai Container Terminals (PSA Mumbai), is developed and operated by PSA International. The Phase 1 with capacity of 2.4 Million TEUs p.a. had completed in Dec 2017. The terminal will have full capacity of 4.8 Million TEUs p.a. and a quay length of 2,000 m by the completion of Phase 2.In 2006, the port implemented the logistics data tagging of containers. JNPT houses India’s best logistics connectivity with facilitation from Container Freight Stations and Logistics parks owned by government as well as private players namely Maharashtra State Warehousing Corporation, DRT, Gateway District Park, Allcargo, Avashya, Continental Warehousing, Ameya Logistics, TransIndia and Contegrate Entrepot. JNPT authorities have been trying to implement direct port delivery model of the containers, a first of its kind model promoted under the ease of doing business in India.

Traffic
 Major exports from Jawaharlal Nehru Port are textiles, sporting goods, carpets, textile machinery, boneless meat, chemicals, and pharmaceuticals. The main imports are chemicals, machinery, plastics, electrical machinery, vegetable oils, and aluminium and other non-ferrous metals. The port handles cargo traffic mostly originating from or destined for Maharashtra, Madhya Pradesh, Gujarat, Karnataka, as well as most of North India.

See also
 Mumbai Port
 Navi Mumbai International Airport
 Ports in India
 Ministry of Ports, Shipping and Waterways
 Uran
 City and Industrial Development Corporation
 Mumbai Port Trust
 Mumbai Trans Harbour Link
 Navi Mumbai

References

External links 
Jawaharlal Nehru Port Trust (JNPT)
Jawaharlal Nehru Custom House

Economy of Mumbai
Economy of Navi Mumbai
Ports and harbours of Maharashtra
Monuments and memorials to Jawaharlal Nehru
Transport in Navi Mumbai